Raush (Rauş) is a rural locality (a khutor) in Rassvetovsky Selsoviet, Davlekanovsky District, Bashkortostan, Russia. The population was 138 as of 2010. There are 2 streets.

Geography 
Raush is located 14 km northwest of Davlekanovo (the district's administrative centre) by road. Olgovka is the nearest rural locality.

References 

Rural localities in Davlekanovsky District